St Mary the Virgin's Church, Great Brickhill is a Grade II* listed parish church in the Church of England in Great Brickhill, Buckinghamshire.

History

The south aisle and chapel were erected in 1460 and the north aisle and chapel were added circa 1500.  In 1865, the church was heavily restored, the exterior being faced with the local greensand rubble with limestone dressings. Dedicated to St. Mary, it is a fairly large church for the size of the village, able to seat 300.

In the church are memorials of the Duncombe, Barton, Pauncefort, and Chase families.

The church has recently undergone major restoration work.

Geography 
Located in Great Brickhill, England.

Parish status
The church is in a joint parish with:
All Saints Church, Bow Brickhill
St Mary Magdalene's Church, Little Brickhill 
St Luke's Church, Stoke Hammond

Organ

The pipe organ dates from 1875 and was built by William Hill and Son. A specification of the organ can be found on the National Pipe Organ Register.

Notes

Churches completed in 1460
Great Brickhill
Great Brickhill